Ericson Core is an American film director and cinematographer, best known for directing the 2006 sports film Invincible and the 2015 film Point Break. He has been director of photography on several films including Payback, The Fast and the Furious, and Daredevil.

Early life and education 
Core attended the Art Center College of Design in Pasadena, California, at age 16, and he then attended USC School of Cinematic Arts in Los Angeles to get a B.A. degree in film production and directing studies. He received a Master of Fine Arts degree in directing and cinematography, also from the Art Center College of Design.

Career 
Core started his career as a music video director and then as a cinematographer for films like Payback, The Fast and the Furious, and Daredevil.

Directing 
Core made his directorial debut with a true-story based sports film Invincible, on which he also remained the director of photography. The film, starring Mark Wahlberg, released on August 25, 2006 by Walt Disney Pictures.

In 2015, Core directed the action-thriller film Point Break, a remake of the 1991 film of the same name, based on a script by Kurt Wimmer. The film starred Édgar Ramírez and Luke Bracey, and it released in the United States on December 25, 2015 by Warner Bros. Pictures.

Filmography

References

External links 
 

Living people
Year of birth missing (living people)
American film directors
American cinematographers
American music video directors
Art Center College of Design alumni
USC School of Cinematic Arts alumni
Action film directors